The Experiment is the 28th book in the Animorphs series, written by K.A. Applegate. It is known to have been ghostwritten by Amy Garvey. It is narrated by Ax.

The front cover quote is "Change is a good thing. A very good thing..." The inside cover quote is "Got milk?"

Plot summary
The Animorphs find out from Erek that the Yeerks have taken control of a meatpacking plant and a laboratory. They acquire chimpanzees and infiltrate the lab. They don't find very much information so Tobias and Ax morph into bulls (thinking they would morph into steer but not realizing that the DNA does not include surgical procedures) to go to the meatpacking plant. Inside the plant, they discover a room with humans in cages. The computer tells them that it is an experiment designed to destroy the free will of the human population so that the Yeerks can take over easily, but a Yeerk scientist eventually confirms that the experiment was a total failure.

Morphs

Animorphs books
1999 science fiction novels
Fiction portraying humans as aliens
1999 American novels